John David Hawes (born March 1, 1951) is a Canadian former competitive swimmer and modern pentathlete.  Hawes won a bronze medal in his signature 200-metre backstroke event at the 1971 Pan American Games in Cali, Colombia, and again at the 1973 World University Games in Moscow.  He competed in the preliminary heats of the men's 200-metre backstroke at the 1972 Summer Olympics in Munich, and the modern pentathlon team and individual events at the 1976 Summer Olympics in Montreal.

References

1951 births
Living people
Canadian male backstroke swimmers
Canadian male modern pentathletes
Modern pentathletes at the 1976 Summer Olympics
Olympic modern pentathletes of Canada
Olympic swimmers of Canada
Sportspeople from Montreal
Swimmers at the 1970 British Commonwealth Games
Swimmers at the 1971 Pan American Games
Swimmers at the 1972 Summer Olympics
Commonwealth Games competitors for Canada
Pan American Games bronze medalists for Canada
Pan American Games medalists in swimming
Universiade medalists in swimming
Anglophone Quebec people
Universiade bronze medalists for Canada
Medalists at the 1973 Summer Universiade
Medalists at the 1971 Pan American Games